Joseph Bradley Varnum Jr. (June 9, 1818 Washington, D.C. – December 31, 1874, Astoria, Queens, then Long Island City, now in Queens, New York City) was an American lawyer and politician.

Life
He was a grandson of Joseph Bradley Varnum. He graduated from Yale College in 1838, where he was a member of Skull and Bones. He studied law at Yale and with Roger B. Taney in Baltimore, Maryland, and was admitted to the bar in 1840. He practiced law in Baltimore for several years before moving to New York City, where he acquired a large practice.

He was a Whig member of the New York State Assembly (New York Co.) in 1849, 1850 and 1851. Varnum was chosen Speaker pro tempore in June 1851, and presided over the Assembly for the duration of the special session. He was again a member of the State Assembly (New York Co., 13th D.) in 1857, and was the Know Nothing candidate for Speaker. At one time he was a member of the Common Council of New York City.

In 1871, he took an active part in the agitation against corruption in the government of New York City. He was a contributor to magazines and newspapers, and published in book form The Seat of Government of the United States (New York, 1848) and The Washington Sketch-Book.

Varnum died on New Year's Eve, 1874. He was buried in Congressional Cemetery in Washington, D.C.

Notes

References
Obituary, in New York Times, January 1, 1875 (misspelling the name of his grandfather)
Obituaries of J.B. Varnum Jr. and other family members buried at Congressional Cemetery, Washington, D.C.
The New York Civil List compiled by Franklin Benjamin Hough (Weed, Parsons & Co., Albany NY, 1858)
Attribution:

1818 births
1874 deaths
New York (state) Whigs
19th-century American politicians
New York (state) Know Nothings
Speakers of the New York State Assembly
Yale College alumni
People from Washington, D.C.
Burials at the Congressional Cemetery